was the third of the sixty-nine stations of the Nakasendō. It is located in Urawa-ku in the present-day city of Saitama, Saitama Prefecture, Japan. Its stone ruins can be found 300 meters from Tsuki Shrine (調神社 Tsuki Jinja). Presently, there is a flea market that takes place on the fourth Saturday of every month in Urawa-shuku's Tsuki Shrine.

Neighboring Post Towns
Nakasendō
Warabi-shuku - Urawa-shuku - Ōmiya-shuku

References

Stations of the Nakasendō
Stations of the Nakasendō in Saitama Prefecture